is a former Japanese football player.

Playing career
Aoshima was born in Shizuoka Prefecture on July 12, 1968. After graduating from high school, he joined his local club Yamaha Motors in 1987. Although he hardly played in any matches at first, he played many matches as forward in 1990–91 season. In 1992, he moved to a new club, the Shimizu S-Pulse, which is based in his hometown. However he could hardly play in the match behind Kenta Hasegawa, Tatsuru Mukojima and Akihiro Nagashima. In 1995, he moved to Japan Football League (JFL) club Tosu Futures. He played as regular player and scored 15 goals. In 1996, he returned to his local and joined JFL club Honda. He played as a regular player and the club won the championship in 1996. He retired at the end of the 1998 season.

Club statistics

References

External links

geocities.jp

1968 births
Living people
Association football people from Shizuoka Prefecture
Japanese footballers
Japan Soccer League players
J1 League players
Japan Football League (1992–1998) players
Júbilo Iwata players
Shimizu S-Pulse players
Sagan Tosu players
Honda FC players
Association football forwards